Antodilanea is a genus of beetles in the family Cerambycidae, containing the following species:

 Antodilanea auana Martins & Galileo, 2004
 Antodilanea modesta (Lane, 1939)

References

Aerenicini